Heinrich Thomas "Heini" Becker  (born 18 January 1935) is a former South Australian politician who represented the South Australian House of Assembly seats of Hanson from 1970 to 1993 and Peake from 1993 to 1997 for the Liberal Party.  He was on the Public Accounts Committee and the Economic and Finance Committee.

Becker's father was Dr. Johannes Heinrich Becker, who was interned during World War II for having Nazi connections, and was deported to West Germany in 1947.

References

Members of the South Australian House of Assembly
1935 births
Living people
Liberal Party of Australia members of the Parliament of South Australia
Members of the Order of Australia
Australian Lutherans
Liberal and Country League politicians
Australian people of German descent